József Nagy may refer to:

József Nagy (athlete), Hungarian athlete who won a bronze medal at the 1908 Summer Olympics
József Nagy (boxer, born 1934), Hungarian boxer who competed at the 1960 Summer Olympics
József Nagy (boxer, born 1953), Hungarian boxer who competed at the 1976 Summer Olympics
József Nagy (boxer, born 1975), Hungarian boxer who competed at the 1996 Summer Olympics
József Nagy (footballer, born 1892), Hungarian football coach who coached the Sweden national football team in the 1934 and 1938 World Cups
József Nagy (footballer, born 1960), Hungarian footballer who played in the 1986 FIFA World Cup
József Nagy (footballer, born 1988), Hungarian footballer
József Nagy (politician), Slovak politician of Hungarian descent